Daniel Keith Swain (born August 18, 1983), known mononymously as Danny!, is an American rapper, record producer, singer, and composer.

Swain rose to prominence after his debut performance on Late Night with Jimmy Fallon, where he premiered his song "Evil". After joining Okayplayer Records, Danny! released his album Payback, cited by AllMusic as one of the best hip-hop releases of the year. In 2013, Ebony magazine listed Swain among other rising artists in its "Leaders of the New School" piece, calling Swain one of a handful of "innovators".

Swain has composed background music that has since been placed in numerous motion pictures and television programs, most notably FOX's animated series Bob's Burgers for which Swain was awarded an Emmy plaque for his contributions to an episode that won in the Outstanding Animated Program category at the 69th Primetime Emmy Awards in 2017.

Early life 
Swain, the only son of military parents, was born in Killeen, Texas and moved to Columbia, South Carolina, as a teenager. He attended Richland Northeast High School and began pursuing music as a hobby during his second year. Swain started penning his own lyrics and recorded songs as a showcase for his production.

Career

2004–2006: Early beginnings, Charm and instrumental albums 

After spending nearly a year networking with local artists, Swain released his debut mixtape The College Kicked-Out. The record received mixed to unfavorable reviews—an up-and-coming Charlamagne tha God was among Kicked-Outs critics, panning the mixtape on air while working as a local radio station personality—which Swain would allude to in much of his later work.

Shortly after Kicked-Outs release Swain was accepted to the Savannah College of Art & Design and accordingly relocated to Savannah, Georgia. It was here that he began to work on his second project, F.O.O.D. The following year Swain officially released his third mixtape Charm, which was notable for featuring an underlying theme of escapism in its narrative of a musician who wants success in music to take him away from his day-to-day routine.

During this time Swain compiled an instrumental album, Dream, Interrupted, in an effort to promote his production; within two years the sequels Dream, Fulfilled and Dream, Extinguished would also be released.

2007–2011: MTV, And I Love H.E.R. and Interscope era 

After Charm, Swain received his first big break when MTV played a role in securing him a recording contract with Definitive Jux, an independent music label, at the time helmed by El-P of Run the Jewels fame. The record deal allowed Swain to release an album through the label, promoting it with a 12" single and accompanying music video slated for an exclusive premiere on mtvU. Though the label's involvement would not amount to a released album—only the single "Just Friends", which charted on the Billboard Hot 100—the deal did establish an ongoing relationship between Swain and MTV, which began using his music extensively in various programs.

Swain self-released his debut album, the faux-soundtrack And I Love H.E.R. The album was cited at the time by publications such as Pitchfork, LA Weekly and ABC News as one of the best releases of the year. And I Love H.E.R. was also notable for introducing another musical direction for Swain, who was experimenting with hip house, downtempo and lounge/electronica to produce a sort of "lounge-hop" hybrid.

Following And I Love H.E.R.s success, Swain completed the Where Is Danny? album. Interscope Records, through its short-lived digital distribution program, distributed a revamped version of the album on iTunes.

2012–present: Breakthrough, music licensing and The Book of Daniel 

After the release of his third studio LP Payback, the title track of Swain's previous album was featured in a commercial for Sonos wireless speakers. Swain signed on as a composer for MTV's internal Hype Music label (later absorbed into Sony/ATV's Extreme Music production music library) and slowly transitioned into a producer role, landing instrumental placements with various Viacom television programming as well as commercials for Nordstrom, McDonald's, and incidental music for Bob's Burgers and its soundtrack, The Bob's Burgers Music Album.

In 2014, Swain started working on a new album, initially titled Deliverance, but later changed to The Book Of Daniel after the book in the Bible. During the album's development Swain appeared in Sesame Streets "Party Bus" video, which featured an original remix of "The Wheels on the Bus" composed by Swain. He also began working as a voiceover artist, narrating a season of Hey Rookie, Welcome to the NFL in 2016 for ESPN. The following year Swain was awarded an Emmy plaque from the Academy of Television Arts & Sciences for his musical contributions to the Bob's Burgers episode "Bob Actually" (Outstanding Animated Program, 2017), composing music for three scenes.

In 2015, a tracklist for The Book of Daniel was revealed at Swain's website. The album debut was announced for February 29, 2016, but it was not released. Another scheduled date, October 31, 2018, passed without the album release.

Discography

Studio albums 
 And I Love H.E.R.: Original Motion Picture Soundtrack
 Where Is Danny?
 Payback
 The Book Of Daniel

Instrumental albums 
 Dream, Interrupted
 Dream, Fulfilled
 Dream, Extinguished

Production credits

Film and television placements/credits

See also 
 Alternative hip hop
 List of former Interscope Records artists
 List of Sony/ATV Music Publishing artists

References

External links 

 
 
 
 

1983 births
Actors from Columbia, South Carolina
African-American record producers
African-American male rappers
American bloggers
Record producers from Texas
American television composers
Interscope Records artists
Living people
Male actors from Atlanta
Musicians from Atlanta
Musicians from Columbia, South Carolina
People from Richland County, South Carolina
People from Savannah, Georgia
Primetime Emmy Award winners
Savannah College of Art and Design alumni
Sony Music Publishing artists
People from Killeen, Texas
21st-century American rappers
21st-century African-American male singers
Rappers from South Carolina
Rappers from Georgia (U.S. state)
Rappers from Texas